The Tanzania Heart Institute (THI) is a specialized cardiac clinic in Dar es Salaam, Tanzania, managed by a non-profit organization. It is located in the northern part of the city, in the residential district of Ada Estate.

It was founded by Dr. Ferdinand Masau. The institute was closed by the government in 2012.

References

Hospitals in Tanzania
Buildings and structures in Dar es Salaam
Heart disease organizations